A quantum is the minimum amount of any physical entity involved in an interaction in physics.

Quantum may also refer to:

Science
 Quantum, in neuroscience, refers to a discrete component of a physiological response
 Quantum Magazine, a physics and science magazine
 Quantum (journal), an open-access journal for research articles on quantum science
 Quantum (TV series), a half-hour science journalism series aired by the Australian Broadcasting Corporation between 1985 and 2001

Businesses and products
 Quantum Corporation, a manufacturer of computer data storage products
 Quantum Sports Cars, a British-built low-volume car manufacturer
 Volkswagen Quantum
 Quantum, a line of Maksutov telescopes that were manufactured by Optical Techniques Incorporated (OTI)
 Quantum, line of small engines made by Briggs and Stratton
 Quantum-class cruise ship
 Pegasus Quantum, a British-built ultralight trike

Computing
 QUANTUM, a suite of attack software by the US National Security Agency (NSA)
 QGIS, an open source GIS program for map-drawing and related functions, formerly called Quantum GIS
 A time slice in computer pre-emptive multitasking
 Quantum (software) a project of Mozilla to improve its Firefox web browser engine

Fiction and entertainment
Quantum (James Bond), the villainous organization featured in Casino Royale and Quantum of Solace
 Quantum (book), a science history book by Manjit Kumar
 Quantum Science Fiction, a line of books published by Dial Press from 1977 to 1981
 Quantum, a ride at Thorpe Park
 Quantum (album), an album by Planet X
 Quantum (comics), a comic book character
 Quantum (video game), an arcade game released by Atari in 1982
 Quantum (2010 video game), a video game developed by Team Tachyon and published by Tecmo for the PlayStation 3

See also
 Quanta (disambiguation)
 Kvant (disambiguation), from Russian Квант, meaning quantum